A  is a hairdresser employed by the Japan Sumo Association to cut and prepare sumo wrestlers' hair, which is done in the  style.

The term  can also be used in its original form, which was for specialists who worked in hairstyling in kabuki.

Ranks and training
There are a total of about 50  employed by the Sumo Association, and as in sumo and most other Japanese disciplines, they are divided into ranks. All of the  start with the kanji  in their names, pronounced .

Tools
The tools of a  include a special kind of wooden comb,  (special pomade or wax), and waxed strips of paper for tying the knot. The wooden combs have been handmade for centuries by the Shingō Mori family. Each comb can take up to eight years to create. The size (length) of the comb is determined by the age of the bush the wood is taken from. A short comb is from a 50-year-old bush and the long comb can be from a 150-year-old bush.

References

External links

Sumo people
Hairdressing
Sumo terminology
Japanese words and phrases